Sainte-Marie may refer to two places in New Brunswick, Canada:

 Sainte-Marie-de-Kent, New Brunswick
 Ste-Marie-St-Raphaël